Estevão Molnar (born 25 August 1915) was a Brazilian fencer. He competed in the individual sabre events at the 1948 and 1952 Summer Olympics.

References

External links
 

1915 births
Year of death missing
Brazilian male sabre fencers
Olympic fencers of Brazil
Fencers at the 1948 Summer Olympics
Fencers at the 1952 Summer Olympics
Pan American Games medalists in fencing
Pan American Games bronze medalists for Brazil
Fencers at the 1951 Pan American Games
Medalists at the 1951 Pan American Games
Brazilian people of Hungarian descent
20th-century Brazilian people